Computer and Management Institute (CMI), approved by Royal Civil Service Commission vide letter no RCSC/S-4/99/4762 dated 13/14 January 1999, was established on 1 February 1999 as a vocational training institute. However, Dasho Tshetrim Tenzin, Dungpa of Phuentsholing, officially inaugurated the institute on 1 June 1999. CMI is approved and registered by Department of Occupational Standards MoLHR vide registration No. DOS/2010120001, CERTIFICATE  OF REGISTRATION: GRADE B.

CMI as a computer training Institute has completed 16 years of imparting training in information technology (IT), commercial accounting and office management. CMI concentrated to provide anticipated training courses to its trainees with spontaneous new impending software packages for comprehensive acquaintance to eliminate instant problems pertaining any prevailing software introduction that would be brought into light. CMI has accredited its courses to National Certificate level 2 in Computer Application Assistant and Commercial Accounting. Accredited by Department of Occupational Standards, Ministry of Labour and Human resources (MoLHR).

CMI is recognized by the Department of Information Technology & Telecom (DITT), MoIC to conduct Dzongkha Linux. Similarly Dzongkha Development Commission has approved CMI to conduct Dzongkha Unicode and Dzongkha secretarial courses to meet the deemed required of running day-to-day office works both in Government and private sectors in Bhutan.

Computer and Management Institute has its branch institute in Thimphu, Changlam (opposite to old city bus parking) building No. 7 4th floor after the approval of the Department of Human Resources, Ministry of Labour and Human Resources, Thimphu. Initially the institute is graded as "C" by the Department of Occupational Standards, (DOS) MoLHR. The Institute will be offering the same training programmes  as of head Office. The competition of rendering the best qualitative training has been the main factor of CMI head office to open up its branch in the capital Thimphu. The branch Institute is set up in Thimphu to have wide coverage in serving quality training.

Mission
Envisaged to produce as many eligible Bhutanese citizens as possible in the field of Computer Technology, efficient system of office management devices and introduction of both Single and Double entry system of Book keeping to meet the augmenting needs of the RGOB and private sectors in Bhutan.

Goals
Produce and disseminate resourceful, technically oriented, quality and efficient personnel to mitigate the challenging need of tomorrow.

Admission procedure
The students admitted to the institute should be aware of the rules and regulations and the system of examinations.

Admission is strictly made to those who qualified Class X with mark sheet from the concerned school for admission in Certificate courses and Class XII for diploma courses. Students should fill up the admission form along with 3 copies of passport size photograph and submit it to the registration officer/Director.

All the candidates seeking admission should produce the following documents:
 Citizenship card.
 Qualification Certificates /mark sheet.

The candidates must ensure that their name and spelling is same in all the documents, similarly, the names of their father or guardian, Dzongkhag, Dungkhag, Gewog, House No.  Thram No. should be same in all the documents mentioned above.

CMI has been absorbing and accommodating least wise 200 numbers class X and XII and imparting valued computer know-how and updated operational training, making each of them a product of any necessities that would devolve on their needs, either to serve as a Government servant or to earn for their livelihood.
CMI reserves itself the right to refuse admission to an individual without assigning any reason. A candidate shall not be entitled to claim admissions as a matter of right even if he or she is making payments for the training.

Career programmes

References

External links
 

Educational organisations based in Bhutan